The Mazda 767/767B are prototype racing cars that were built by Mazdaspeed for the 24 Hours of Le Mans running under the IMSA-spec GTP class.

Two 767s were entered at 1988 24 Hours of Le Mans, finishing 17th and 19th overall, however they finished behind a sole 757 which was able to finish 15th.  In the All Japan Sports Prototype Championship, Mazda managed 4th in the constructors' championship.  For 1989, Mazda upgraded the 767 into the 767B, and initially tested it in the IMSA 24 Hours of Daytona, where it was successful in finishing 5th overall.  Later in the year, Mazda returned to Le Mans with two 767Bs as well as an older 767.  The 767Bs were able to finish 7th and 9th overall, while the lone 767 was able to finish 12th.  However, in JSPC, the results were not as promising, as Mazda finished a mere 5th in the championship.  For 1990, a single 767B was entered alongside two newer 787s, and was the only car of the three to finish, although in 20th overall.

References

767
IMSA GTP cars
Cars powered by Wankel engines
24 Hours of Le Mans race cars
Group C cars
Sports prototypes